The McClure–Shelby House near Nicholasville, Kentucky was built in c. 1840.  It includes elements of Greek Revival architecture and Federal architecture.  The  property was listed on the National Register of Historic Places in 1978.  It then included three contributing buildings.

The house was built for farmer and landowner Andrew McClure.  His daughter, Sarah B. McClure, later married Isaac Shelby, a grandson of Isaac Shelby, first governor of the Kentucky.

References

Houses on the National Register of Historic Places in Kentucky
Federal architecture in Kentucky
Greek Revival houses in Kentucky
Houses completed in 1840
Houses in Jessamine County, Kentucky
National Register of Historic Places in Jessamine County, Kentucky
1840 establishments in Kentucky